Expensify, Inc. is a software company that develops an expense management system for personal and business use. Expensify also offers a business credit card called the Expensify Card.

History

Expensify was founded in 2008 by current CEO David Barrett. Barrett, a native of Saginaw, Michigan, and a graduate of the University of Michigan, began programming at the age of six. He was involved in numerous tech companies prior to Expensify, including Red Swoosh, for which he developed the file transfer technology. Red Swoosh was later purchased by Akamai Technologies. Barrett has said he founded Expensify because of his "hatred" of expense reports--the company's slogan is "Expense reports that don't suck!" 

The company has completed several rounds of venture capital funding, raising $1 million in 2009, $5.7 million in 2010, $3.5 million in 2014, and $17 million in 2015.

Expensify has offices in San Francisco; Portland, Oregon; London, U.K.; Melbourne, Australia; and Ironwood, Michigan, an office opened in a nod to Barrett's Michigan roots. The company, which expanded its operation in Michigan in 2014, partnered with Gogebic Community College to offer scholarships to students in the area.
In July 2015, CEO David Barrett addressed United States Congress on behalf of the app industry, speaking to a House, Health, and Technology subcommittee. 

In November 2017, the company faced allegations that it had exposed some customers' personal information to contractors manually entering receipts through Amazon's Mechanical Turk service. Expensify acknowledged that a bug allowed fewer than 200 receipts to be visible to certain company contractors using Mechanical Turk to test a new feature under development. The company halted the test.

The company went public on 11 November 2021 under the ticker EXFY.

Products

Expensify has developed a reporting expense mobile and web application available in the Apple and Android marketplaces. The app tracks and files expenses such as fuel, travel, and meals; once users photograph receipts, artificial intelligence identifies the merchant, date and amount of the transaction, then automatically categorizes and saves the expense. It also allows users to create receipts from online purchases that can be submitted for reimbursement.

Expensify allows users to download expense reports based on user transactions. It also integrates with other financial applications and can also automatically import expenses incurred with partner companies.

Expensify Ventures

Expensify launched a venture capital arm, Expensify Ventures, as part of a $17 million round of funding the company received in early 2015. Expensify Ventures makes strategic investments in early-stage travel, payments, and finance start-ups.

Political activism

On 22 October 2020, Barrett sent emails to all Expensify customers and non-customers on Expensify's marketing list worldwide, urging them to vote for U.S. presidential candidate Joe Biden. He argued that the ongoing existence of U.S. democracy itself depended on Biden's winning.

Awards and recognition

 Tabby Award, 2018
 Readers Choice Award-Expense & Travel Management Solutions, CPA Practice Advisor, 2018
 Forbes Cloud 100, 2016
 World's Top 10 Most Innovative Companies, Fast Company, 2015
 Tabby Award, 2015
 Top 10 Free Mobile Sales App, Inc. Magazine, 2014 ''

References

External links
 
 Expensify Ventures official website

Software companies of the United States
American companies established in 2008
Software companies established in 2008
Companies based in San Francisco
Expense management
Software companies based in the San Francisco Bay Area
2021 initial public offerings
Companies listed on the Nasdaq
2008 establishments in California